Jérémy Frarier (born 12 February 1981) is a French curler.

Teams

References

External links

Living people
1981 births

French male curlers
Place of birth missing (living people)